Statistics of Úrvalsdeild in the 1972 season.

Overview
It was contested by 8 teams, and Fram won the championship. ÍBV's Tómas Pálsson was the top scorer with 15 goals.

League standings

Results
Each team played every opponent once home and away for a total of 14 matches.

References

Úrvalsdeild karla (football) seasons
Iceland
Iceland
1972 in Icelandic football